Édouard Belet (1893 – 11 January 1988) was a Swiss wrestler. He competed in the freestyle lightweight event at the 1924 Summer Olympics.

References

1893 births
1988 deaths
Olympic wrestlers of Switzerland
Wrestlers at the 1924 Summer Olympics
Swiss male sport wrestlers
Place of birth missing